This is a list of biological virus upper-level taxa. See also Comparison of computer viruses

This is an alphabetical list of biological virus higher taxa. It includes those taxa above family, ranging from realm to suborder, that are included in the ICTV's 2020 taxonomy release.

For a list of individual species, see List of virus species.

For a list of virus genera, see List of genera of viruses.

For a list of family-level viral taxa, see List of virus families and subfamilies.

Realms
Adnaviria
Duplodnaviria
Monodnaviria
Riboviria
Ribozyviria
Varidnaviria

Kingdoms

Bamfordvirae
Heunggongvirae
Helvetiavirae
Loebvirae
Orthornavirae
Pararnavirae
Sangervirae
Shotokuvirae
Trapavirae
Zilligvirae

Phyla and subphyla

Phyla

Artverviricota
Cossaviricota
Cressdnaviricota
Dividoviricota
Duplornaviricota
Hofneiviricota
Kitrinoviricota
Lenarviricota
Negarnaviricota
Nucleocytoviricota
Peploviricota
Phixviricota
Pisuviricota
Preplasmiviricota
Saleviricota
Taleaviricota
Uroviricota

Subphyla
Haploviricotina
Polyploviricotina

Classes

Alsuviricetes
Amabiliviricetes
Arfiviricetes
Caudoviricetes
Chrymotiviricetes
Chunqiuviricetes
Duplopiviricetes
Ellioviricetes
Faserviricetes
Flasuviricetes
Herviviricetes
Howeltoviricetes
Huolimaviricetes
Insthoviricetes
Laserviricetes
Leviviricetes
Malgrandaviricetes
Magsaviricetes
Maveriviricetes
Megaviricetes
Miaviricetes
Milneviricetes
Monjiviricetes
Mouviricetes
Naldaviricetes
Papovaviricetes
Pisoniviricetes
Pokkesviricetes
Polintoviricetes
Quintoviricetes
Repensiviricetes
Resentoviricetes
Revtraviricetes
Stelpaviricetes
Tectiliviricetes
Tokiviricetes
Tolucaviricetes
Vidaverviricetes
Yunchangviricetes

Orders and suborders

Orders

Algavirales
Amarillovirales
Articulavirales
Asfuvirales
Baphyvirales
Belfryvirales
Blubervirales
Bunyavirales
Caudovirales
Chitovirales
Cirlivirales
Cremevirales
Cryppavirales
Durnavirales
Geplafuvirales
Ghabrivirales
Goujianvirales
Halopanivirales
Haloruvirales
Hepelivirales
Herpesvirales
Imitervirales
Jingchuvirales
Kalamavirales
Lefavirales
Ligamenvirales
Martellivirales
Mindivirales
Mononegavirales
Mulpavirales
Muvirales
Nidovirales
Nodamuvirales
Norzivirales
Ortervirales
Orthopolintovirales
Ourlivirales
Patatavirales
Petitvirales
Piccovirales
Picornavirales
Pimascovirales
Polivirales
Priklausovirales
Primavirales
Recrevirales
Reovirales
Rowavirales
Sepolyvirales
Serpentovirales
Sobelivirales
Stellavirales
Timlovirales
Tolivirales
Tubulavirales
Tymovirales
Vinavirales
Wolframvirales
Zurhausenvirales

Suborders

Abnidovirineae
Arnidovirineae
Cornidovirineae
Mesnidovirineae
Monidovirineae
Nanidovirineae
Ronidovirineae
Tornidovirineae

See also

 Virus
 Virology
 Virus classification
 WikiSpecies:Virus
 Wikipedia:WikiProject Viruses
 List of virus species
 List of virus genera
 List of virus taxa

References

External links

 ICTV
 Master Species Lists at International Committee on Taxonomy of Viruses (ICTV)